Joan Prather is an American actress, best known for her role as Janet McArthur Bradford (wife of David) in Eight Is Enough.

Early life
 
Prather was born in Dallas, Texas. Prather first began acting in grade-school stage productions, and was a regular on the teen dance show "Sump'n Else" during her high school years. She graduated from Highland Park High School in 1969.

Film and television credits

Her film credits include The Single Girls (1974), Big Bad Mama (1974), The Devil's Rain (1975), Smile (1975), Rabbit Test (1978) and Take This Job and Shove It (1981).

She appeared in TV series such as Executive Suite, Eight Is Enough, CHiPs, Fantasy Island, and the 1980 edition of Battle of the Network Stars. 

During her teen years, Joan was a featured "go-go" dancer on a local Dallas teen dance TV show called Sump'n Else.  The show ran from 1965 to 1968 and it was roughly modeled after "American Bandstand" and often featured national and local bands.

Scientology

While on the set of The Devil's Rain, Prather told an "extremely unhappy" John Travolta that Scientology had helped her, inspiring him to get involved with the religion upon his later return to Los Angeles.

Personal life
 
Prather quit acting in the late 1980s. She was married to James J Fiducia for five years in the late 1970s, and is currently married to lawyer Douglas J. Frye and lives in Malibu, California. In September 2008, she was arrested for felony hit-and-run in Malibu and was released on $50,000 bail.

References

External links 
 

Living people
American film actresses
20th-century American actresses
American television actresses
Actresses from Dallas
21st-century American women
Year of birth missing (living people)